Soviet Russia may refer to:

Countries 
 Russian Soviet Federative Socialist Republic, an independent state (1917–1922) and republic of the Soviet Union (1922–1991) 
 Soviet Union (1922–1991), often also called Soviet Russia

Exhibitions 
 Soviet Russia (exhibition, 1960)
 Soviet Russia (exhibition, 1965)
 Soviet Russia (exhibition, 1967)
 Soviet Russia (exhibition, 1975)

Other uses 
 Soviet Russia, a magazine of the Friends of Soviet Russia in the United States in the 1920s
 Sovetskaya Rossiya (Soviet Russia), a Soviet and Russian newspaper since 1956
 In Soviet Russia, a common joke sometimes called the "Russian Reversal"

See also 
 
 Russia
 Russian Republic (1917)